Silvio Nahuel Ulariaga (born 2 March 2002) is an Argentine professional footballer who plays as a centre-forward for Godoy Cruz.

Club career
Ulariaga started his career at the age of six with Club Deportivo Plaza Italia. In 2011, Ulariaga headed to Juventud Unida Universitario. In 2016, the forward joined Godoy Cruz. Ulariaga, after penning professional terms in 2019, was promoted into Diego Martínez's first-team in December 2020, initially as a sub for Copa de la Liga Profesional games with Central Córdoba and Newell's Old Boys. Ulariaga made his senior debut in the same competition on 27 December, as he started an eventual 6–1 loss to Racing Club. He scored his first goal in the process after five minutes, though departed nine minutes later with a knee injury.

International career
In July 2017, Ulariaga was called up by Diego Placente for the Argentina U15s ahead of friendlies with Huracán and Estudiantes.

Career statistics
.

Notes

References

External links

2002 births
Living people
People from Veinticinco de Mayo Partido
Argentine footballers
Argentina youth international footballers
Association football forwards
Argentine Primera División players
Godoy Cruz Antonio Tomba footballers
Sportspeople from Buenos Aires Province